Victor Okechukwu Brown (born 30 March 1984 in Nigeria) is a Nigerian retired footballer.

Career

After helping Nigeria come 2nd at the 2001 FIFA U-17 World Championship, Brown played for Nigerian top flight side Enyimba International ad well as Maccabi Haifa in the Israeli top flight.

References

External links
 Victor Brown at playmakerstats.com

Nigerian footballers
Association football forwards
1984 births
Living people